Shafiq Chitou (born 23 May 1985) is a Beninese boxer. He qualified to compete in boxing at the 2012 Summer Olympics, but funding woes are a concern for him. He currently works as a house painter. Chitou lost to Félix Verdejo of Puerto Rico in the first round of the Men's lightweight event at the 2012 Summer Olympics.

References 

1985 births
Beninese male boxers
Living people
Boxers at the 2012 Summer Olympics
Olympic boxers of Benin
House painters
People from Cotonou
Lightweight boxers